Andrew Ackers (born 25 December 1993) is an English professional rugby league footballer who plays as a  for the Salford Red Devils in the Betfred Super League and England at international level.

He previously played for the Swinton Lions in the Championship and Championship 1, for the London Broncos in the Championship, and for the Toronto Wolfpack in the Betfred Championship and the Super League.

Background
Ackers was born in Golborne, Wigan, Greater Manchester, England. He started playing Rugby League as a 12-year-old for Golborne Parkside, before signing for Hindley.

Playing career

Early career
Ackers was recruited as an 18-year-old into the Wigan Warriors Academy. He played for the under-18's during the 2012 season, but was released without making a single first team appearance. Ackers was then signed by Warrington after a successful trial, and captained their under-19's team in 2013.

Ackers joined Championship side Swinton Lions on loan for the 2014 season before signing a permanent deal with the club a year later. He scored 26 tries in 56 games over a two-year period.

London Broncos

Ackers became a full time professional as a 23-year-old at the London Broncos signing for the 2016 and 2017.

It was announced on 9 May 2016, that Ackers extended his contract to the end of the 2018 season.
The London Broncos finished 2nd in both 2016 and 2017, thus he played in the Qualifiers Super 8's for a place in Super League. 

Ackers last game for London was an away game against Widnes Vikings in the Qualifiers on 16 September 2017. Shortly after, he left the club after the Broncos accepted his request to be released for family reasons.

Toronto Wolfpack
Ackers signed for Canadian-based club Toronto Wolfpack a few days after his release. The move was criticised by London Broncos, as Ackers had initially requested his release in order to spend more time with his family in the north of England. In both seasons in the Championship his team made the finals stages.  His first season saw his club beaten by 4 points at 2 in the Million Pound Game with Ackers sinbinned in the final for a high tackle. 

His second season saw his club beat part-time Featherstone to be promoted. His third season saw Toronto lose all their Super League games and become hot favourites for relegation.  Ackers suddenly left in June 2020; a few weeks before the events at Toronto that would see them ultimately liquidated.

Salford
On 4 June 2020, Ackers left Toronto and signed a contract with Salford that would run until 2022. Following an impressive start to the 2022 season it was announced Ackers had signed one-year contract extension with Salford Red Devils which would keep him at the AJ Bell Stadium until the end of the 2023 season.

England
Following an outstanding season with Salford, Ackers was announced as part of Shaun Wane's England World Cup squad on 30 September 2022.
In the third group stage match at the 2021 Rugby League World Cup, Ackers scored two tries for England in a 94-4 victory over minnows Greece.

References

External links

Salford Red Devils profile
SL profile
Toronto Wolfpack profile
Broncos profile
England profile

1993 births
Living people
England national rugby league team players
English rugby league players
London Broncos players
People from Golborne
Rugby league hookers
Rugby league players from Wigan
Salford Red Devils players
Swinton Lions players
Toronto Wolfpack players